20-N is a symbolic abbreviation used to denote the date of death of two of the best known and controversial figures in 20th-century Spanish history.  The first date, 20 November 1936, near the end of the first year of the Spanish Civil War, marks the execution in Alicante of 33-year-old José Antonio Primo de Rivera, the founder of the fascist party, Falange Española (Spanish Phalanx), who became extolled as a cult figure during the years of post-civil war Francoist Spain led by Francisco Franco.

The second date, 39 years later, is 20 November 1975, when Generalísimo Franco – aged 82, and having ruled Spain for close to four decades as its dictator, or as he called himself, caudillo (Spanish for leader) – died in bed following a lengthy illness.  The date continues to be commemorated by far-right groups which mark it by organizing public demonstrations.

Other incidents  
 In a startling coincidence, the same day also proved to be fatal to Primo de Rivera's political opposite, 40-year-old Buenaventura Durruti, a key leader of Spain's two largest anarchist organizations, Federación Anarquista Ibérica (Iberian Anarchist Federation) and the anarcho-syndicalist trade union Confederación Nacional del Trabajo (National Confederation of Labor).  Durruti's death occurred, according to his chauffeur, in the midst of distant gunfire in the trenches of Madrid.
 The Spanish general election on November 20, 2011 coincided with the 75th anniversary of Primo de Rivera's execution and the 36th anniversary of Franco's death.
 November 20 is also the anniversary of the assassination of Basque nationalist politicians Santiago Brouard, murdered in 1984, and Josu Muguruza, assassinated in 1989. In both cases it is believed that the date of the assassination was symbolically chosen to coincide with 20-N.

In popular fiction
 And in the Third Year, He Rose Again is a 1980 satirical film based in a novel by Fernando Vizcaíno Casas. On 20 November 1978, Franco rises from the dead.

References 
Payne, Stanley G. (1961) Falange. A History of Spanish Fascism. Stanford University Press.
Thomas, Hugh. "The Hero in the Empty Room: Jose Antonio and Spanish Fascism," Journal of Contemporary History (1966) 1#1 pp. 174–182 in JSTOR.
Velarde Fuertes, Juan. "José Antonio y la economía" Grafite ediciones. .
Hugh Thomas The Spanish Civil War.  Middlesex, England: Penguin Books Ltd., 1965.
Emma Goldman Durruti is Dead, Yet Living (1936).
Antony Beevor The Spanish Civil War (1982).
Abel Paz Durruti in the Spanish Revolution, Translated by Chuck W. Morse, AK Press, 2007. .
Pedro de Paz The Man Who Killed Durruti Read and Noir (2005).
Hans Magnus Enzensberger The Short Summer of Anarchy: Life and Death of Buenaventura Durruti (1972) (originally: Der kurze Sommer der Anarchie: Buenaventura Durrutis Leben und Tod).
Collective work Buenaventura Durruti, a double CD  nato, (1996).

External links 

Plataforma2003.org
Buenaventura Durruti in the Spanish Revolution. Biopic by Paco Rios based on the book by Abel Paz
Buenaventura Durruti at the Anarchist Encyclopedia.

November observances
1936 in Spain
1975 in Spain
Francoist Spain
Falangism
Far-right politics in Spain